iDisk is a file hosting service offered by Apple Inc. to all Mac OS 9.X users, and later on MobileMe members that enabled them to store their digital photos, films and personal files on-line so they could be accessed remotely. All Mac OS 9.X users received a 50MB iDisk. With a standard MobileMe subscription, users received a 20 GB iDisk.

iDisk integrated with Mac OS X, appearing as a network drive. Mac OS X v10.3 through v10.6 could cache updates to an iDisk volume while off-line and synchronize updates later. Any WebDAV client could also access an iDisk volume.

Apple discontinued iDisk, along with many MobileMe (formerly .Mac and iTools) products in 2012. iDisk users could sign up for the iCloud beta or download their files.

Folders
The "Sites" folder of a MobileMe iDisk contained the files created by HomePage, the MobileMe online web authoring tool.
The "Web" folder of a MobileMe iDisk contained the files created by iWeb, part of the iLife suite.
The "Software" folder of a MobileMe iDisk contained MobileMe exclusive software, such as GarageBand Jam Packs.
The "Public" folder of a MobileMe iDisk was used to host downloads.

The "Public", "Sites" and "Web" folders were the only ones which could be accessed by people other than the iDisk owner, but the "Public" folder could be made password protected via the MobileMe Preference Pane in Mac OS X.

Backup application
Included with iDisk in the MobileMe bundle was Backup, a software utility that allowed users to back up local files to an iDisk. The software was also used to restore files from the iDisk, or any other drive/location selected in the backup app.

See also
Apple Inc.
macOS
MobileMe
iCloud
WebDAV
File hosting service
Google Drive
Dropbox
OneDrive (previously SkyDrive)

References

External links
Me.com  – Apple user website from which MobileMe users accessed their iDisk online.
How to copy someone's else folders from public.me.com with a wget-like tool?

Apple Inc. software
File hosting